The National Bahujan Congress is a political party in India, founded on 15 November 2008 as Yogendra Makwana (a former Union Minister and Dalit leader) broke away from the Indian National Congress.

References

Political parties in India
Political parties established in 2008